The Bristol 188 is a British supersonic research aircraft built by the Bristol Aeroplane Company in the 1950s. Its length, slender cross-section and intended purpose led to its being nicknamed the "Flaming Pencil".

Design and development
The aircraft had its genesis in Operational Requirement 330 for a high speed (Mach 3) reconnaissance aircraft, which eventually developed into the Avro 730. As the 730 was expected to operate at high speeds for extended periods of time, more data was needed on high speed operations, leading to Operational Requirement ER.134T for a testbed capable of speeds greater than Mach 2. The aircraft was expected to run at these speeds for extended periods of time, allowing it to study kinetic heating effects on such an aircraft. The aircraft was expected to spend a considerable amount of time with a skin temperature around 300 Celsius.

Several firms took interest in this very advanced specification and the eventual contract (6/Acft/10144) was awarded to Bristol Aircraft in February 1953.

Bristol gave the project the type number 188, of which three aircraft were to be built, one a pure test bed and the other two (constructor numbers 13518 and 13519) for flight testing. Under contract number KC/2M/04/CB.42(b) serial numbers XF923 and XF926 were given on 4 January 1954 to the two that would fly. To support the development of the Avro 730 Mach 3 reconnaissance bomber, another three aircraft were ordered (Serial Numbers XK429, XK434 and XK436). The follow-up order was cancelled when the Avro 730 programme was cancelled in 1957 as part of that year's review of defence spending. The 188 project was continued as a high speed research aircraft.

The advanced nature of the aircraft meant that new construction methods had to be developed. Several materials were considered for construction and two specialist grades of steel were selected: a titanium-stabilized 18-8 austenitic steel and a 12%-Cr steel used in gas turbines (Firth-Vickers Rex 448). These had to be manufactured to better tolerances in sufficient quantities for construction to start. The 12% chromium stainless steel with a honeycomb centre was used for the construction of the outer skin, to which no paint was applied. Riveting was a potential method for construction but the new arc welding technique using an argon gas shield known as puddle welding was used. There were long delays with the method, which was less than satisfactory. The W. G. Armstrong Whitworth company provided substantial technical help and support to Bristol during this period; they produced major sections of the airframe as a subcontractor. North American used the same methods of argon welding of stainless steel honeycomb sheet metal for the XB-70 Valkyrie bomber.

A fused-quartz windscreen and canopy and cockpit refrigeration system were designed and fitted but were never tested in the environment for which they had been designed.

The specification for the aircraft required engine installations which permitted the fitting of different air intakes, engines and propelling nozzles. The 188 was originally intended to have Avon engines  but the half ton lighter each Gyron Junior was substituted in June 1957, necessitating the engines mounted further forward with longer nacelles and jet pipes.

The Gyron Junior was then under development for the Saunders-Roe SR.177 supersonic interceptor and incorporated a fully variable reheat, which achieved a smooth variation in thrust between dry and full reheat, so being one of the first in the world to give continuous variation in thrust from idle to max reheat. This choice of powerplant resulted in the 188 having a typical endurance of only 25 minutes, not long enough for the high-speed research tests that were required. Chief Test Pilot Godfrey L. Auty reported that while the 188 transitioned smoothly from subsonic to supersonic flight, the Gyron Junior engines were prone to surging beyond that speed, causing the aircraft to pitch and yaw.

In order to solve the aerodynamic and flutter problems, a large number of scale models were tested. Some, mounted on converted rocket boosters, were launched from RAE Aberporth, for free-flight investigation.

Operational history

In May 1960, the first airframe was delivered to the Royal Aircraft Establishment at Farnborough for structural tests, both heated and unheated, before moving on to RAE Bedford. XF923 undertook the first taxiing trials on 26 April 1961, although due to problems, the first flight was not until 14 April 1962. XF923 was intended to remain with Bristol for its initial flights and evaluation before turning it over to the MoA. XF926 had its first flight, using XF923s engines, on 26 April 1963. XF926 was given over to RAE Bedford for its flying programme. Across 51 flights, it reached a top speed of Mach 1.88 (1,440 mph : 2,300 km/h) at 36,000 ft (11,000 m). The longest subsonic flight lasted only 48 minutes, as 70% of its fuel was needed to reach its operational altitude.

The first prototype made its first public appearance in September 1962 when it was displayed on the ground and in the air at that year's Farnborough Air Show.  In the same year the aircraft was seen in the film Some People.

Measurements collected during testing were recorded onboard and transmitted to the ground station for recording. The flight information transmitted meant that a "ground pilot" could advise the pilot.

The project suffered a number of problems, the main being that the fuel consumption of the engines did not allow the aircraft to fly at high speeds long enough to evaluate the "thermal soaking" of the airframe, which was one of the main research areas it was built to investigate. Nonetheless, although the 188 programme was eventually abandoned, the knowledge and technical information gained was put to some use for the future Concorde program. The inconclusive nature of the research into the use of stainless steel led to Concordes being constructed from conventional aluminium alloys with a Mach limit of 2.2. Experience gained with the Gyron Junior engine, which was the first British gas turbine designed for sustained supersonic operation, additionally later assisted with the development of the Bristol (later Rolls-Royce) Olympus 593 powerplant which was used on both Concorde and the BAC TSR-2.

The announcement that all development was terminated was made in 1964, the last flight of XF926 taking place on 12 January 1964. In total the project cost £20 million. By the end of the programme, considered the most expensive to date for a research aircraft in Great Britain, one aircraft had to be "cannibalised" in order to keep the other airframe flightworthy.

Surviving aircraft
In April 1966, both 188 fuselages were transported to the Proof and Experimental Establishment at Shoeburyness, Essex to act as targets for gunnery trials, but during 1972, XF926 was dismantled and moved to RAF Cosford (without its engines) to act as instructional airframe 8368M, and is preserved at the Royal Air Force Museum Cosford in Shropshire.  XF923 was subsequently scrapped at Foulness.

Operators

 Royal Aircraft Establishment

Specifications (Bristol 188)

Notable appearances in media
Bristol 188 XF923 was prominently featured in Some People (1962), a feature film primarily shot in Bristol.

See also

References

Citations

Bibliography
 Butler, Phil. "The Bristol 188". Air-Britain Aeromilitaria, Spring 2004, Vol. 30, Issue 116. pp. 11–14. 
Buttler, Tony and Jean-Louis Delezenne. X-Planes of Europe: Secret Research Aircraft from the Golden Age 1946-1974. Manchester, UK: Hikoki Publications, 2012. 
 King, H. F., Technical Editor. "Bristol 188: A Versatile Research Aeroplane." Archive: Flight International, 3 May 1962, pp. 695–703, 705. via flightglobal.com.
 Winchester, Jim. The World's Worst Aircraft: From Pioneering Failures to Multimillion Dollar Disasters. London: Amber Books Ltd., 2005. .

External links

 Bristol Type 188 (ER.134)8
 Royal Air Force Museum Bristol Type 188
 Extract from footage of Type 188 tests

1960s British experimental aircraft
188
Aircraft first flown in 1962